Port Huron is a city in the U.S. state of Michigan and the county seat of St. Clair County. The population was 30,184 at the 2010 census. The city is adjacent to Port Huron Township but is administered separately.

Located along the St. Clair River, it is connected to Point Edward, Ontario in Canada via the Blue Water Bridge. The city lies at the southern end of Lake Huron and is the easternmost point on land in Michigan. Port Huron is home to two paper mills, Mueller Brass, and many businesses related to tourism and the automotive industry. The city features a historic downtown area, boardwalk, marina, museum, lighthouse, and the McMorran Place arena and entertainment complex.

History
This area was long occupied by the Ojibwa people. French colonists had a temporary trading post and fort at this site in the 17th century.

In 1814 following the War of 1812, the United States established Fort Gratiot at the base of Lake Huron. A community developed around it. The early 19th century was the first time a settlement developed here with a permanent European-American population. In the 19th century, the United States established an Ojibwa reservation in part of what is now Port Huron, in exchange for their cession of lands under treaty for European-American settlement. But in 1836, under Indian Removal, the US forced the Ojibwa to move west of the Mississippi River and resettle in what are now the states of Wisconsin and Minnesota.

In 1857, Port Huron became incorporated. Its population grew rapidly after the 1850s due a high rate of immigration: workers leaving poverty, famine, and revolutions in Europe were attracted to the successful shipbuilding and lumber industries in Michigan. These industries supported development around the Great Lakes and in the Midwest. In 1859 the city had a total of 4,031 residents; some 1855, or 46%, were foreign-born or their children (first-generation Americans).

By 1870, Port Huron's population exceeded that of surrounding villages. In 1871, the State Supreme Court designated Port Huron as the county seat of St. Clair County.

On October 8, 1871, the city, as well as places north in Sanilac and Huron counties, burned in the Port Huron Fire of 1871. A series of other fires leveled Holland and Manistee, Michigan, as well as Peshtigo, Wisconsin and Chicago, Illinois on the same day. The Thumb Fire that occurred a decade later, also engulfed Port Huron.

In 1895 the village of Fort Gratiot, in the vicinity of the former Fort Gratiot, was annexed by the city of Port Huron.

The following historic sites have been recognized by the State of Michigan through its historic marker program.
 Fort St. Joseph. The fort was built in 1686 by the French explorer Duluth. This fort was the second European settlement in lower Michigan. This post guarded the upper end of the St. Clair River, the vital waterway joining Lake Erie and Lake Huron. Intended by the French to bar English traders from the upper lakes, the fort in 1687 was the base of a garrison of French and Indian allies. In 1688 the French abandoned this fort. The site was incorporated into Fort Gratiot in 1814. A park has been established at the former site of the fort. 
 Fort Gratiot Light. The Fort Gratiot Lighthouse was built in 1829 to replace a tower destroyed by a storm. The light, automated in 1933, continues to guide shipping on Lake Huron into the narrow and swift-flowing St. Clair River. It was the first lighthouse established in the State of Michigan.
 Lightship Huron. From 1935 until 1970, the Huron was stationed in southern Lake Huron to mark dangerous shoals. After 1940 the Huron was the only lightship operating on the Great Lakes. Retired from Coast Guard Service in 1970, she was presented to the City of Port Huron in 1971.
 Grand Trunk Railway Depot. The depot, which is now part of the Port Huron Museum, is where 12-year-old Thomas Edison departed daily on the Port Huron–Detroit run. In 1859, the railroad's first year of operation, Edison convinced the railroad company to let him sell newspapers and confections on the daily trips. He became so successful that he soon placed two newsboys on other Grand Trunks running to Detroit. He made enough money to support himself and to buy chemicals and other experimental materials.
 Port Huron Public Library. In 1902 the city of Port Huron secured money from philanthropist Andrew Carnegie to erect a municipal library and arranged for matching operating funds. In 1904, a grand Beaux-Arts-style structure was built at a cost of $45,000. At its dedication, Melvil Dewey, creator of a widely used book classification system, delivered the opening address. The Port Huron Public Library served in its original capacity for over sixty years. In 1967, a larger public library was constructed. The following year the former library was renovated and re-opened as the Port Huron Museum of Arts and History. An addition was constructed in 1988.
 Harrington Hotel. The hotel opened in 1896 and is a blend of Romanesque, Classical and Queen Anne architecture. The hotel closed in 1986, but a group of investors bought the structure that same year to convert it into housing for senior citizens. The Harrington Hotel is listed on the National Register of Historic Places.
 Grand Trunk Western Railroad Tunnel. The tunnel was opened in 1891 and links Port Huron with Canada. This international submarine railway tunnel was the first international tunnel in the world. The tunnel operations were electrified in 1908; half a century later they were converted to use diesel fuel. Tracks were lowered in 1949 to accommodate larger freight cars. During World War I, a plot to blast the tunnel was foiled. A new tunnel has since been opened.

The city was hit by a violent F4 tornado on May 21, 1953, damaging or destroying over 400 structures, killing two, and injuring 68.

The city received the All-America City Award in 1955 and 2005.

In June 1962, the Port Huron Statement, a New Left manifesto, was adopted at a convention of the Students for a Democratic Society. The convention did not take place within the actual city limits of Port Huron, but instead was held at a United Auto Workers retreat north of the city (now part of Lakeport State Park).

Port Huron is the only site in Michigan where a lynching of an African-American man took place. On May 27, 1889, in the early morning, a mob of white men stormed the county jail to capture 23-year-old Albert Martin. A mixed-race man, he was accused of attacking a woman. They hanged him from the 7th Street Bridge. A memorial was installed in 2018 at the site, recounting Martin's history. The city collaborated with the Equal Justice Initiative on this memorialization.

Historic photographs

Geography
The city is considered to be part of the Thumb area of  East-Central Michigan, also called the Blue Water Area. The easternmost point (on land) of Michigan can be found in Port Huron, near the site of the Municipal Office Center and the wastewater treatment plant. The Black River divides the city in half, snaking through Port Huron and emptying into the St. Clair River near Downtown.

Climate

Port Huron has a humid continental climate (Köppen climate classification Dfa) with hot summers, cold winters and rain or snow in all months of the year.

Demographics

Port Huron is the largest city in the Thumb area, and is a center of industry and trade for the region.

2010 census
As of the census of 2010, there were 30,184 people, 12,177 households, and 7,311 families residing in the city. The racial makeup of the city was 84.0% White, 9.1% African American, 0.7% Native American, 0.6% Asian, 1.2% from other races, and 4.5% from two or more races. Hispanic or Latino of any race were 5.4% of the population.

There were 12,177 households, of which 32.5% had children under the age of 18 living with them, 34.5% were married couples living together, 19.9% had a female householder with no husband present, 5.6% had a male householder with no wife present, and 40.0% were non-families. 33.0% of all households were made up of individuals, and 11.8% had someone living alone who was 65 years of age or older. The average household size was 2.42 and the average family size was 3.03.

The median age in the city was 35.8 years. 25.6% of residents were under the age of 18; 9.9% were between the ages of 18 and 24; 26.3% were from 25 to 44; 25.2% were from 45 to 64; and 13.1% were 65 years of age or older. The gender makeup of the city was 47.8% male and 52.2% female.

Culture

 There are a number of museums in town. The Port Huron Museum is a series of four museums, namely:
 Carnegie Center (Port Huron Museum)
 Huron Lightship
 Thomas Edison Depot Museum
 Fort Gratiot Lighthouse
 The Great Lakes Maritime Center offers opportunities to learn about the history of the Great Lakes. Freighters pass within  of the glass windows, and there is an underwater live camera feed.
The Desmond District Demons is a horror film festival, held at the end of October annually. The festival focuses on elevating the horror genre, hosting independent film screenings alongside a Dark Arts Exhibition showcasing local artists.
The Black River Film Society is a community focused on cultivating the areas independent film screenings and host regular film related events, such as premiering Stockholm (2018 film) in Michigan, Tough Guy: The Bob Probert Story and Sincerely Brenda.
 The School for Strings presents over 50 concerts each year with its Fiddle Club, Faculty, and Student Ensembles. It provides music education across the area.
 Each year, the Port Huron to Mackinac Boat Race is held, with a starting point in Port Huron north of the Blue Water Bridge. The race finishes at Mackinac Island, crossing Lake Huron. It is considered by some boaters to be a companion to the longer Chicago Yacht Club Race to Mackinac.
 The Port Huron Civic Theatre began in 1956 by a group of theater lovers. Since 1983, it has used McMorran Place for its productions.
 The Blue Water Film Festival (2010-2014) was held in the fall, which had notables such as Chris Gore, Sid Haig, Curtis Armstrong, Timothy Busfield, Loni Love, Dave Coulier.
 The main branch of the St. Clair County Library is located in downtown Port Huron. The library contains more than 285,300 books, nearly 200 magazine subscriptions, and over 22,700 books on tape, books on compact disc, music compact discs, cassettes, and videos.
 The International Symphony Orchestra of Sarnia, Ontario and Port Huron, Michigan perform events at McMorran Place, Port Huron Northern Theatre and Temple Baptist Church in Sarnia.
 Encompassing over 100 homes and buildings, the Olde Town Historic District is Port Huron's first and only residential historic district. The Olde Town Historic Neighborhood Association is an organization working to preserve historic architecture in Port Huron. They have hosted an annual historic home tour, flower plantings and beautification and neighborhood Christmas decorations.
The Welkin Base Ball Club is Port Huron's historic vintage base ball team. Modeled on Port Huron's first baseball club from 1867, the Welkin Base Ball Club re-creates the time of baseball's roots.

Pop culture
A reference to the Port Huron Statement was made in the Coen Brothers film The Big Lebowski.

In 2009 the TV show Criminal Minds used Port Huron, and Detroit as locations for an episode involving crossing the border into Ontario.

Sports

Port Huron has had a strong tradition of minor league hockey for many years.

The Port Huron Flags played in the original International Hockey League from 1962 to 1981, winning three Turner Cup championships in 1966, 1971 and 1972. Its leading career scorers were Ken Gribbons, who played most of his career in the IHL; Bob McCammon, a lifelong IHLer who went on to be a National Hockey League coach with the Philadelphia Flyers and the Vancouver Canucks; Bill LeCaine and Larry Gould, who played a handful of NHL games with the Pittsburgh Penguins and the Vancouver Canucks, respectively.

Legendary NHL hockey broadcaster Mike Emrick started his career doing play-by-play hockey for the Flags on AM 1450 WHLS in the mid 1970s. Emrick would go on to broadcast Olympic hockey games and Stanley Cup playoffs for NBC Sports, and is a frequent guest contributor to sister station WPHM.

Port Huron was also represented in the Colonial Hockey League (also operating under the names United Hockey League and International Hockey League), with franchises from 1996 until the league folded in 2010. Originally called the Border Cats, the team was renamed the Beacons in 2002, the Flags in 2005 and the Icehawks in 2007. Among the more notable players were Bob McKillop, Jason Firth, Tab Lardner and Brent Gretzky.

The Port Huron Fighting Falcons of the junior North American Hockey League played at McMorran Place, beginning in 2010 until 2013. The team moved to Connellsville, PA for the 2014 season. The team's name was changed to the Keystone Ice Miners.

Port Huron is also home to the Port Huron Prowlers of the Federal Prospects Hockey League.

The Port Huron Pirates indoor football team dominated the Great Lakes Indoor Football League up until their departure to Flint, MI. McMorran Arena once again hosted indoor football with the Port Huron Predators of the Continental Indoor Football League in 2011. The Predators failed to finish the 2011 season, and were replaced in 2012 by the Port Huron Patriots who also participated in the CIFL.

Parks
This includes three public beaches and six parks with picnic facilities. The city also has nine scenic turnout sites containing over 250 parking spaces. Port Huron operates the largest municipal marina system in the state and has five separate locations for boat mooring.

The city has 14 public parks, 4 smaller-sized “tot” parks, 19 playgrounds (City owned), 9 playgrounds (School owned), 33 tennis courts, including 16 at schools and 6 indoors, 3 public beaches, 4 public swimming pools, 1 community center, and 1 public parkway.

Government
The city government is organized under a council–manager government form. The City Council is responsible for appointing a city manager, who is the chief administrative officer of the city. The manager supervises the administrative affairs of the city and carries out the policies established by the City Council. As the Chief Administrative Officer, the City Manager is responsible for the organization of the administrative branch and has the power to appoint and remove administrative officers who are responsible for the operation of departments which carry out specific functions. The City Council consists of seven elected officials—a mayor and six council members. Beginning with the 2011 election, citizens voted separately for Mayor and Council. Council members will serve staggered four-year terms and the mayor will serve a two-year term. The current mayor is former city clerk Pauline Repp. The city levies an income tax of 1 percent on residents and 0.5 percent on nonresidents.

Federally, Port Huron is part of Michigan's 10th congressional district, represented by Republican Lisa McClain, elected in 2020.

Education
High schools
 Port Huron Northern High School
 Port Huron High School
 Harrison Center

Colleges

 St. Clair County Community College

Economy

Industry

Some of Port Huron's earliest industries, like most Michigan towns, were related to the agriculture industry. A large grain elevator was located on the St. Clair River just north of the current Municipal Office Center. A bean dock was located on the St. Clair River, where dry edible beans from points north in the Thumb were loaded into ships. The dock operated as the Port Huron Terminal Company. Currently the bean dock is used as an event venue. Port Huron was also a national leader in the chicory coffee substitute industry. Future Congressman Henry McMorran in 1902 started Port Huron's chicory processing plant, located on the Black River near 12th Avenue. A second chicory plant operated at 3rd and Court Streets in Port Huron, which would later be purchased by McMorran's son. The roadside weed which grew in areas of the Thumb and Saginaw Valleys was brought to Port Huron for processing and then shipped worldwide. Chicory was commonly used as a coffee substitute especially in wartime.

Wartime also brought another industry to Port Huron: the Mueller Metals Company, which built a factory in Port Huron in 1917. The plant primarily made shell casings for World War I. The factory was originally owned by the Mueller Co., and since has been spun off into its own entity called Mueller Industries. The Port Huron Factory is still in operation, located on Lapeer Road on the city's west side, where they produce a variety of valves and fittings.

The Peerless Cement Company operated a cement plant just south of the Blue Water Bridge from the 1920s through the 1970s. The waterfront site is now the location of the Edison Inn and Blue Water Convention Center.

There are two paper mills in Port Huron. Dunn Paper operates a specialty paper mill at the mouth of the St. Clair River just north of the Blue Water Bridge. Domtar also operates a paper mill in Port Huron, located on the Black River. It was originally built in 1888 by the E. B. Eddy Company. The Domtar mill also specializes in specialty papers for the medical and food service industries. Adjacent to the Domtar Mill is the site of the former Acheson Colloids Company. Dr. Edward Acheson in 1908 founded the company, which made a variety of chemical and carbon-based products. The factory was purchased by Henkel and closed in 2010. However, Henkel continues to manufacture ink and carbon products under the Acheson brand.

A variety of factories related to the automotive industry occupy Port Huron's Industrial Park on the city's south side. Many of these produce plastic components for vehicles.

Shipbuilding

Jenks Shipbuilding Company was founded in 1889, renamed in 1903 as Port Huron Shipbuilding and ceased operations sometime after 1908. The shipyard was found on the north bank of the Black River between Erie Street and Quay Street which is now a parking area for Bowl O Drome and Port Huron Kayak Launch.

Ships built by Jenks includes:

 SS John B. Cowle - bulk freighter 1902
 MS Normac - former fireboat and floating restaurant 1902

Healthcare

Port Huron is served by two acute care facilities, McLaren Port Huron (formerly known as Port Huron Hospital), and Lake Huron Medical Center (formerly known as St. Joseph Mercy Hospital Port Huron).

McLaren Health Care Corporation, a nonprofit managed care health care organization based in Flint, purchased the former Port Huron Hospital and began operating the 186-bed facility as Mclaren Port Huron in May 2014.

Lake Huron Medical Center, is a 144-bed facility operated by Ontario, California based Prime Healthcare Services. The for-profit company purchased the former St. Joseph Mercy Port Huron hospital in September 2015 from Trinity Healthcare. Upon completion of the sale, the formerly non-profit Catholic institution converted to a for-profit entity.

Finance

Port Huron's longtime financial institution was Citizens Federal Bank. The financial institution's headquarters was located in Port Huron with branches throughout the Thumb. The bank's name was changed to Citizens First in 1997. In early 2010, Citizens First was closed by the Michigan Office of Financial and Insurance Regulation. It the first bank in Michigan to fall victim of the financial crisis of 2007–2008. The assets of Citizens First were acquired by First Michigan bank of Troy. First Michigan would be renamed Talmer Bancorp before being purchased by Chemical Financial Corporation (now TCF Financial Corporation) in 2016.

Media

Radio
The first station to sign on in Port Huron was WHLS, coinciding with the opening of the Blue Water Bridge in 1938. It was founded by Harold Leroy Stevens and Fred Knorr. John Wismer became part owner of the station in 1952. He would later launch the first cable television system in Port Huron and WSAQ in 1983. Wismer died in 1999.

The Times Herald launched its own radio station in 1947 known as WTTH. That station would later become WPHM, and was bought by Lee Hanson in 1986. WPHM got FM sister station WBTI in 1992. Wismer and Hanson were direct competitors until they were both bought by Bob Liggett's Radio First in 2000.

Radio First owns and operates five radio stations in the region while Port Huron Family Radio is the licensee of sole station WGRT. Non-commercial stations include St. Clair County Regional Education Service Agency's WRSX, high school station WORW, and religious broadcasters WNFA and WNFR.

The following is a list of broadcast radio stations that provide local content to the Port Huron Area. Other stations may be heard area over the air however their content is not directed to residents of the city.

Local FM
 WNFA 88.3 FM, Port Huron, Religious, Blue Water Christian Hit Radio
 CBEG-FM 90.3 FM, Sarnia (relays CBEW-FM), Public, CBC Radio One 
 WNFR 90.7 FM, Port Huron, Religious, Wonderful News Radio
 WRSX 91.3 FM, Port Huron, Alternative, Freeform, Port Huron's NPR News Station
 WORW 91.9 FM, Port Huron, Educational, The Wave
 WBGV 92.5 FM, Marlette, Country, The Thumb's Best Country
 WBTI 96.9 FM, Lexington, CHR/Top 40, Today's Hit Music
 WTGV 97.7 FM, Sandusky, Adult Contemporary, Light & Easy Listening
 CBEF-3-FM 98.3 FM, Sarnia (relays CBEF), Public, Ici Radio-Canada Première
 CFGX-FM 99.9 FM, Sarnia, Hot AC, Your Perfect Music Mix
 WGRT 102.3 FM, Port Huron, Adult Contemporary, Your Great Music Station
 CHOK-1 103.9 FM, Sarnia (relays CHOK AM), Full Service/AC, First in Local Information 
 W288BT 105.5 FM, St. Clair (relays WHLS AM), Active Rock, Port Huron's Alternative
 CHKS-FM 106.3 FM, Sarnia ON, Mainstream Rock, Great Classics and the Best New Rock
 WSAQ 107.1 FM, Port Huron, Country, Q-Country, The Greatest Country Music of All Time

Local AM

 WMIC 660 AM, Sandusky (Daytime Only), Full Service/Country, The Thumb's Information Station
 CHOK 1070 AM, Sarnia, Full Service/AC, First in Local Information
 WHLS 1450 AM, Port Huron, Active Rock, Port Huron's Alternative
 WPHM 1380 AM, Port Huron, News/Talk/Sports, Where the Blue Water Area Comes to Talk
 WHLX 1590 AM, Marine City, Active Rock, Port Huron's Alternative

Newspaper
 The Times Herald , a daily local newspaper serving St Clair County and Sanilac counties. It is owned by Gannett, which also owns the Detroit Free Press and USA Today.
 Daily editions of the Detroit Free Press and The Detroit News are also available throughout the area.

Broadcast television
St. Clair County lies in the Detroit television market. Channels available on Comcast are as follows:

Detroit Area
 WJBK 2 (Fox)
 WDIV-TV 4 (NBC)
 WXYZ-TV 7 (ABC)
 WMYD 20 (Independent)
 WPXD 31 (Ion)
 WADL 38 (MyNetworkTV)
 WKBD 50 (The CW)
 WTVS 56 (PBS)
 WWJ-TV 62 (CBS)

Southwestern Ontario
 CBET-DT (9.1 CBC)
 CIII-DT-29 (29.1 Global)

St. Clair County also receives the following stations from the Sarnia / London area, but are currently not carried on cable:

 CKCO-TV-3 42 (CTV)
 CFPL-DT (10.1 CTV Two)
 CHCH-DT-2 (51.1 Independent)
 CICO-DT-59 (33.1 TVOntario)

Transportation

Major highways
Two Interstates terminate at the Port Huron-to-Sarnia Blue Water Bridge, and they meet Highway 402.
 enters the area from the west, coming from Lansing and Flint, terminating at the approach to the Blue Water Bridge in Port Huron, along with I-94. On the Canadian side of the border, in Sarnia, Ontario, the route heads easterly designated as Highway 402. (Once fully completed, the mainline of I-69 will span from the U.S.–Mexico border in Brownsville, Texas, to the U.S.–Canada border in Port Huron, Michigan.)
 enters the Port Huron area from the southwest, having traversed the entire Metro Detroit region, and, along with I-69, terminates at the approach to the Blue Water Bridge in Port Huron. On the Canadian side of the border, in Sarnia, Ontario, the route heads easterly designated as Highway 402.

 follows the Lake Huron/Saginaw Bay shoreline, beginning in Bay City and ending in at junction with I-94/I-69, and BL I-94/BL I-69 on the north side of the city.
 begins at BL I-94 in Marysville just south of the city and continues southerly.
 runs west from M-25 to M-19.

Mass transit
The Blue Water Area Transit system, created in 1976, includes eight routes in the Port Huron area. Blue Water Transit operates the Blue Water Trolley, which provides a one-hour tour of various local points of interest. Commuters could take an express bus traveling down I-94 and get off at the 23 Mile Road SMART Bus stop. At the same time, another bus will travel down M-25 and M-29 and pick up commuters in Marysville, Saint Clair and Algonac before ending up at the same stop on 23 Mile Road. This new system will help people in St. Clair County travel through Metro Detroit.

Rail

 Amtrak provides intercity passenger rail service on the Blue Water route from Chicago to Port Huron (Amtrak station).
 Two class one freight railroads operate in Port Huron – Canadian National Railway (CN) and CSX Transportation (CSXT) with international connections via the St. Clair Tunnel.
 Via Rail train service from Toronto to Sarnia (part of the Quebec City–Windsor Corridor) is also available; however, this train does not cross the river, requiring passengers to make arrangements for road travel to Port Huron.

Airports
St. Clair County International Airport is a public airport located five miles (8 km) southwest of the central business district.

Notable people
 Edward Goodrich Acheson (1856–1931), inventor of carborundum
 Emma Eliza Bower (1852–1937) physician, club-woman, and newspaper owner, publisher, editor
 Burt D. Cady, politician
 Jack Campbell, hockey player
 Ezra C. Carleton, mayor and congressman
 Robert Hardy Cleland, judge
 Omar D. Conger, senator for Michigan
 Deepchord, electronic music producer
 Thomas Edison (1847-1931), inventor and entrepreneur, moved to Port Huron in 1854
 Elizabeth Farrand, author and librarian
 Shawn Faulkner, football player
 Eugene Fechet, army officer
 Otto Fetting, religious leader
 Obadiah Gardner, senator for Maine
 Jim Gosger, baseball player
Dorothy Henry, illustrator, cartoonist, painter
 Bill Hogg, baseball pitcher
 Herbert W. Kalmbach, attorney for President Richard Nixon
 Fred Lamlein, baseball player
 Michael Mallory, author
 Steve Mazur, guitarist
 Robert J. McIntosh, politician and pilot
 Terry McMillan, author
 Henry McMorran, businessman and congressman
 Marko Mitchell, football wide receiver
 Colleen Moore, silent movie era actress
 John Morrow, football center
 Jason Motte, baseball pitcher
 Robert C. Odle, Jr., lawyer
 Clifford Patrick O'Sullivan, judge
 Dick Van Raaphorst, football placekicker
 Kevin Rivers, tech businessman and songwriter
 Frank Secory, baseball player and umpire
 Frederick C. Sherman, admiral
 Annah May Soule (1859-1905), professor at Mount Holyoke College
 Nina Spalding Stevens (1876-1959), museum director
 Sara Stokes, singer
 Dennis Sullivan, mathematician
 John Swainson, (1925–1994), Governor of Michigan and a Justice of the Michigan Supreme Court
 Stephan Thernstrom, professor and author
 Harold Sines Vance, businessman and government official
 Kris Vernarsky, amateur ice hockey player
 Felix Watts, inventor
 Harry Wismer, broadcaster and sports team owner
 James Kamsickas, businessman

See also

 Port Huron Statement
 Shipwrecks of the 1913 Great Lakes storm
 Blue Water River Walk
 That Certain Feeling

References

External links
 City of Port Huron

Surrounding communities

 
Cities in St. Clair County, Michigan
County seats in Michigan
St. Clair River
Populated places on Lake Huron in the United States
Michigan populated places on the St. Clair River
Populated places established in 1857
1857 establishments in Michigan